Pulchranthus is a genus of flowering plants belonging to the family Acanthaceae.

Its native range is Southern Tropical America.

Species:

Pulchranthus adenostachyus 
Pulchranthus congestus 
Pulchranthus surinamensis 
Pulchranthus variegatus

References

Acanthaceae
Acanthaceae genera